Capital punishment is a legal penalty in Eritrea. Its execution methods are hanging and shooting. However, Eritrea is considered “Abolitionist in Practice.” Eritrea’s last execution took place in 1989. There is currently no one under sentence of death in Eritrea. Eritrea voted in favor of the 2020 United Nations moratorium on the death penalty.

References

Eritrea
Law of Eritrea